The Pakistan national cricket team toured India in the 1979–80 season. The two teams played six Tests. India won the test series 2–0 with 4 tests being drawn.

Test matches

1st Test

2nd Test

3rd Test

4th Test

5th Test

6th Test

References

External links
 Tour home at ESPNcricinfo
 

1979 in Indian cricket
1979 in Pakistani cricket
1980 in Indian cricket
1980 in Pakistani cricket
Indian cricket seasons from 1970–71 to 1999–2000
International cricket competitions from 1975–76 to 1980
1979-80